Chaniotis (Chaniótis  or , Chanióti), is a tourist town located in the eastern part of the peninsula of Kassandra, Chalkidiki, Greece. The population in 2011 was 893, the elevation is 10 m. The population during the summer increases many times.  Chanioti is situated on the northeastern coast of the peninsula, 3 km northwest of Pefkochori, 4 km southeast of Polychrono, 7 km northeast of Nea Skioni and 89 km southeast of Thessaloniki. There are forests in the mountains near Chaniotis, and farmlands along the coast. The beach of Chaniotis attracts many tourists.

Population

Chanioti old village area is a unique place that in the past years people choose to live and to work due to its natural beauty and benefits that springs and underground waters were provided transforming a unique microclimate of warm winters and cool summers. Old village local temperatures are higher during the winter than Thessaloniki, Athens and even Crete island and summers temperature is cooler and lower than Thessaloniki, Athens and Crete. Additionally the native trees and plantations are unique and different than the rest area of Halkidiki where pine trees are usual. The old village area is appropriate for eco green buildings for quality and healthy living.

References

External links

Hanioti Village: guide for Hanioti, Chalkidiki

Chaniotis GTP Travel Pages (in English and Greek)

Populated places in Chalkidiki